INTEC Education College (INTEC), formerly known as the Centre for Preparatory Studies or Pusat Pendidikan Persediaan (PPP), Overseas Preparatory Programme (OPP) or Program Persediaan Luar Negeri (PPLN), and the International Education Centre (INTEC)International Education College (INTEC). The institution is the place where students undergo specially prepared programs before they further their studies abroad in countries such as the United States, United Kingdom, Germany, France, Australia, Korea and Japan. They are now also providing professional accountancy courses such as ACCA and CIMA.

History 

INTEC Education College,(INTEC) was established at 1982 as a preparatory center of MARA University of Technology (UiTM). The college was previously known as Center for Preparatory Studies or Pusat Pendidikan Persediaan (PPP). It was then known as Overseas Preparatory Program (OPP) or Program Persediaan Luar Negeri (PPLN) in the period from year 2000 until November 2001 when it was renamed yet again as International Education Center to reflect its role as a provider of international education.

On 4 October 2010, it was upgraded to a college by the Executive Committee of UiTM. With the upgrade, the college was renamed as International Education College and given a redesigned logo. However, it retains its acronym INTEC and motto, Distinctly Global. In 2014, INTEC has been privatised and no longer part of Universiti Teknolgi Mara (UiTM)

Role as UiTM's learning centre 
INTEC is one of the preparatory colleges in MARA University of Technology (UiTM). Due to its location in Seksyen 17, Shah Alam, it is also known to some people as UiTM Seksyen 17. Despite the bumiputra-only admission policy of UiTM, INTEC admits non-bumiputra sponsored students. As of 2013, however, INTEC has been emancipated from UiTM and has established itself as its own private college.

Programmes offered at INTEC

American Top University Program 
The institute offers two different preparatory programs to prepare students to pursue tertiary education in the United States.  These programs are the American Degree Foundation Program and the American Credit Transfer Program. Together these two programs are known as the American Top Universities Program (ATU).

South Australia Certificate of Education international(SACEi) 
SACEi Programme is a one-and-a-half-year program for selected students intending to pursue studies at universities in Australia and New Zealand. Courses are conducted based on the curriculum set by the Senior Secondary Assessment Board of South Australia (SSABSA), Adelaide. Students will acquire the South Australian Certificate of Education (SACE), which is recognised by all Australian and New Zealand universities. It is also accepted by some universities in the United Kingdom and Canada.  The programme prepares students to major in both Science (Engineering, Medicine, Dentistry, Pharmacy, Biotechnology, etc.) and Non-Science (Accountancy, Actuarial Science, Economics, Architecture, etc.) courses.

Russian Program (RP) 
The Russian Program prepares students to attend Russian universities, primarily in the medical field.   The program lasts 2–8 months depending on the month of intake.  Intensive Russian language courses up to 25 hours per week are taught by Russian lecturers who are mainly from Voronezh and Volgograd of Russia. Russian program has been discontinued.

A-Level Medicine (ALM) 
The two-year A-Level Medicine program prepares students to pursue studies in Medicine, Pharmacy and Dentistry abroad. This programme is set up specifically to train and guide students effectively so that they can attain at least 12 points (the equivalent of three B-grades) in their A-level examinations to help students to get placements in selected universities. Most of the students here are PSD (Public Service Department) scholars.

A-Level Germany (ALG) 
A-Levels Germany started off as an Edexcel A-Level course for JPA scholars destined to do Engineering in Germany. The A-Level German Programme (ALG) was specially developed by UiTM Section 17 Campus and the State of Baden Württemberg Germany, in 1995  It is conducted in INTEC (International Education Centre) Shah Alam, a branch of UiTM.  The Edexcel A-Levels course is modular, with 6 units (papers) per subject. 
Students sit for the main A-Level papers (Chemistry, Physics, and Mathematics) at the end of the first 2 years. There are 5 semesters consisting of 6-month periods each (total 2.5 years). 
Now, ALG students undergo the CIE Cambridge A-Level course for 1.5 years. A-Level Germany students also have to take  language tests like the German language tests (the Cambridge AS-Level German test and the DSH German test). Total duration of the ALG course is 22 months and intake is in May.

IPAC Education
UiTM has created Centre of Professional Accountancy UiTM (IPAC Education) on 9 March 2015 as a private entity under UiTM Holdings, this programme is for accountancy. 
Programmes that is running under IPAC are:

 CAT
 ACCA
 ICAEW

Residential College 
INTEC provide residential college for student, which are Cemara, Akasia and Cendana. Cemara and Akasia are located at Section 18 while Cendana Residential College located at Section 6, Shah Alam is the residential college for students from various overseas preparatory programmes offered at INTEC Education College. The residential colleges provide living quarter's facilities for almost 2500 students. The administration and management of the residential college is headed by a manager and 1 assistant manager appointed by INTEC. The residential college staffs includes 12 resident staffs, and 3 technician.

Cemara and Akasia Residential College is located beside Mydin Supermarket, Giant Hypermarket, Ole-ole Mall and near a host of convenience stores and a park. Other than catered buses by INTEC, students also have easy access to the readily available public transportations in the area.

Cemara and Akasia Residential College consists of 19 apartment blocks and a dining hall. Each apartment houses 4 to 5 students. Male students are placed in Cemara and Cendana while female students in 2 Cemara blocks and Akasia.

See also 
MARA University of Technology

References 

Colleges in Malaysia
Universities and colleges in Selangor
Educational institutions established in 1983
1983 establishments in Malaysia
Universiti Teknologi MARA
Cambridge schools in Malaysia